Kausooth is an unincorporated community in Marshall County, West Virginia, United States.

References 

Unincorporated communities in West Virginia
Unincorporated communities in Marshall County, West Virginia